Egyptian Grammar: Being an Introduction to the Study of Hieroglyphs was written by Alan Gardiner and first published in 1927 in London by the Clarendon Press. It has been reprinted several times since. The third edition published in 1957 is the most widely used version for the subject. Through a series of thirty-three lessons, the book gives a very thorough overview of the language and writing system of Ancient Egypt. The focus of the book is the literary language of the Middle Kingdom. The creation of the book resulted in the development of an accurate and detailed hieroglyphic typeset, Gardiner's Sign List.

Gardiner's work is considered to this day to be the most thorough textbook of the Egyptian language in existence, although subsequent developments have supplanted a number of aspects of Gardiner's understanding of Egyptian grammar, particularly with regard to the verbal system.

Editions

 First edition (1927), Oxford: Clarendon Press.  
 Second edition, fully revised (1950), London: Published on behalf of the Griffith Institute, Ashmolean Museum, Oxford, by Oxford University Press. 
 Third edition, revised (1957), Oxford: Griffith Institute,

See also
Gardiner's Sign List

External links
 Full text of Egyptian Grammar (1st edition) at HathiTrust Digital Library

Egyptology books
Grammar books
Ancient Egyptian language
Clarendon Press books
1927 non-fiction books